The 1886 Brooklyn Hills football team was an American football team that represented the Brooklyn Hill Football Club who had been playing football since at least the year prior, in the American Football Union during the 1886 football season. Coached and captained by William Halsey, notable halfback, captain, and secretary of the fledgling American Football Union, the Hills compiled a 3–5–3 (of games confirmed), and finished 0–1–2 in AFU play before resigning from the Union on November 16 due to a lack of league games scheduled for Saturday and an inability to complete the rest of their conference schedule. The Brooklyn Hills were also not allowed to claim their forfeit win against the Unions of Columbia, as an AFU meeting on the same day confirmed.

Schedule

References

BBrooklyn Hill Football Club
Brooklyn Hills football seasons
Brooklyn Hill Football Club